Roberval is a city on the south-western shore of Lac Saint-Jean in the Le Domaine-du-Roy Regional County Municipality of Quebec, Canada. With a population of 9,840 in the Canada 2021 Census, it is the fourth largest city on this lake after Alma, Dolbeau-Mistassini and Saint-Félicien.
It is the seat of the Domaine-du-Roy RCM and the main service centre for the region with a hospital and some government services. It is also the seat of the judicial district of Roberval.

It is the only Lac Saint-Jean town whose core is directly on the lakeshore.

Benoît Bouchard, former cabinet Minister and Canadian Ambassador in France, and Michel Gauthier, former federal Leader of the Opposition, represented the area in the federal parliament. Bernard Lord the former Premier of New Brunswick was born here.

Roberval was the 2008 winner of Kraft Hockeyville. In their newly renovated arena, Roberval hosted an NHL preseason game between the Montreal Canadiens and the Buffalo Sabres on September 23, 2008.

Roberval is the home of the Traversée internationale du lac St-Jean, an annual swimming competition held since 1955. The 2010 FINA World Open Water Swimming Championships were also hosted in Roberval.

History
Circa 1850, the first settlers began to colonize the area, followed afterwards by families especially from the Charlevoix area. The settlement, the oldest village on the shores of Lake Saint-Jean, was first known as Notre-Dame-du-Lac-Saint-Jean, named after the parish founded in 1854. A few years later in 1857, the Municipality of Lac-Saint-Jean was formed but in 1859 was split into several municipalities including the Municipality of Roberval. It was named after the geographic township of Roberval, which in turn was named by surveyor Joseph Bouchette in honour of the first Lieutenant General of New France Jean-François de la Roque de Roberval (1496–1560). In 1862, the Roberval post office opened.

In 1884, the settlement separated from the municipality to form the Village Municipality of Roberval. It experienced rapid growth in the 1880s when Horace Jansen Beemer, an American entrepreneur from Philadelphia, came to Roberval. He established logging and sawmill businesses and led the construction of the railroad to Quebec City in 1888. Beemer personally took care of logging, land speculation, and construction of railway bridges. He also built a tourist complex in Roberval in 1898, centred on fishing for landlocked salmon and organized excursions to the Grande Décharge (outlet of Lake Saint-Jean). A fire destroyed the Grand Hotel Roberval in 1908, putting an abrupt end to luxury tourism in the Lake Saint-Jean area.

In 1903, the village of Roberval gained town (ville) status, and in 1956, city (cité) status. In 1976, it merged with the Municipality of Roberval to form the current city.

Demographics 

In 2021, the median age was 52.4, as opposed to 41.6 for all of Canada. French was the mother tongue of 98.0% of residents in 2021. The next most common mother tongues were Atikamekw at 0.8%, followed by Arabic, English, and Spanish at 0.3%. 0.2% reported both English and French as their first language. Additionally there were 0.5% who reported both French and a non-official language as their mother tongue.

As of 2021, Indigenous peoples comprised 11.0% of the population, most of whom were First Nations, and visible minorities contributed 0.8%. The largest visible minority groups in Dolbeau-Mistassini are Latin American (0.3%) and Black (0.2%).

In 2021, 79.8% of the population identified as Catholic, a 14.6% decrease from 2011, while 13.6% said they had no religious affiliation. Baptists were the largest religious minority, making up 0.3% of the population.

Counting both single and multiple responses, the most commonly identified ethnocultural ancestries were:

(Percentages may total more than 100% due to rounding and multiple responses).

Population trend:
 Population in 2021: 9,840 (2016 to 2021 population change: -2.1%)
 Population in 2016: 10,046 
 Population in 2011: 10,227 
 Population in 2006: 10,544
 Population in 2001: 10,906
 Population in 1996: 11,640
 Population in 1991: 11,628

Education 
Roberval has two primary schools: Notre-Dame et Benoît-Duhamel and a secondary school la Cité Étudiante. There are also two centres for adult training: Ste-Ursules et le Centre de formation professionnelle (CFP).

The Ursulines 
Founded in 1882 by Sister Saint-Raphaël, the Ursuline convent was the first domestic sciences school in Canada. There was also an agricultural school.

Fires in 1897 and 1919 led to rebuilding and improvement of facilities.

Following a fire in 2005, a portion of the convent was replaced by the Jardin des Ursulines, a craft vendors market. In 2011, after 129 years of service to the community, the Ursuline community left Roberval.

Climate
Roberval has a cold and highly seasonal humid continental climate (Köppen Dfb), with mild summers, cold winters and high annual snowfall. Due to seasonal lag and influence from the nearby lake, September is well above the subarctic threshold as the fourth warmest month.

See also
 Roberval—Lac-Saint-Jean, a Canadian federal electoral district
 Ouiatchouaniche River
 Ouiatchouan River
 List of towns in Quebec

References

External links

  Ville de Roberval
 La Traversée du lac St-Jean

 
Cities and towns in Quebec
Populated places established in 1855
1855 establishments in Canada